Peter Lundgren was the defending champion, but did not participate this year.

Milan Šrejber won the title, defeating Ramesh Krishnan 6–2, 7–6 in the final.

Seeds

Draw

Finals

Top half

Bottom half

References

 Main Draw

Singles